This is a list of schools for people on the autism spectrum.

Australia
Ashdale Secondary College
Alkimos College
Western Autistic School

Singapore
Pathlight School

United Kingdom
Alderwasley Hall School, Derbyshire
Breckenbrough School, North Yorkshire
Exeter House School, Wiltshire
Kensington Aldridge Academy, London
Pennyhooks Farm Trust, Oxfordshire
Silverwood School, Wiltshire
Swalcliffe Park School, Oxfordshire
TreeHouse School, Haringey, London

United States

Arizona
Gateway Academy

California
Exceptional Minds
Orion Academy
University of California, Berkeley

Connecticut
Franklin Academy

Georgia 
Lionheart School

Massachusetts
New England Center for Children

Michigan
Burger School for Students with Autism

New Jersey
Alpine Learning Group

New York
Eden II School for Autistic Children

South Carolina
Easley High School

References

 
Autism Spectrum